Bolshaya Semyonovskaya is a rural locality (a village) in Pyatovskoye Rural Settlement, Totemsky District, Vologda Oblast, Russia. The population consisted of 25 people, as of the 2010 census.

Geography 
Bolshaya Semyonovskaya is located 4 km north of Totma (the district's administrative centre) by road. Uglitskaya is the nearest rural locality.

References 

Rural localities in Tarnogsky District